Strength of a Woman Tour was the tenth concert tour by American R&B recording artist Mary J. Blige, in support of her thirteenth studio album, Strength of a Woman (2017). The tour began on April 2, 2017 in London and ended in Oakland on September 9, 2017. According to Pollstar's 2017 Year End top 200 North American Tours, the tour grossed over $9 million in North America alone and over $15 million worldwide.

Critical reception
Karu F. Daniels from NBC News stated that Blige "...is blowing away audiences with a raw and rapturous concert performance that is undeniable."

Opening acts 
 Lalah Hathaway 
 LeToya Luckett  
 Joe 
 Stokley Williams

Setlist

{{hidden
| headercss = background: lavender; font-size: 100%; width: 95%;
| contentcss = text-align: left; font-size: 100%; width: 95%;
| header = Oceania and Europe
| content = 

"The One"
"Enough Cryin"
"I Can Love You"
"You Bring Me Joy"
"Reminisce"  / "Real Love" / "You Remind Me"
"Be Happy"
"Love No Limit" 
"Strength of A Woman"
"Don't Mind" 
"Share My World" / "Everything"
"My Life"
"I'm Goin' Down"
"Set Me Free"
"Love Don't Live Here Anymore"
"U + Me (Love Lesson)"
"Thick of It"
"Not Gon' Cry"
"No More Drama"
"Love Yourself"
Encore
"Family Affair"

}}
{{hidden
| headercss = background: lavender; font-size: 100%; width: 95%;
| contentcss = text-align: left; font-size: 100%; width: 95%;
| header = North America
| content =

"Be Happy"
"The One"
"Enough Cryin"
"Just Fine"
"Love Yourself"
"I Can Love You"
"Reminisce"
"Real Love"
"Love No Limit" / "You Bring Me Joy" / "You Remind Me"
"Don't Mind"
"Share My World" / "Everything"
"My Life"
"I'm Goin' Down"
"Set Me Free"
"Strength Of a Woman"
"Love Don't Live Here Anymore"
"U + Me (Love Lesson)"
"Glow Up"
"Thick Of It"
"Not Gon Cry"
"No More Drama"
Encore
"Family Affair"

}}

Tour dates

References 

Mary J. Blige concert tours
2017 concert tours